This is a list of parks in Pittsburgh.  Some are managed by Pittsburgh Parks Conservancy, some are private, and others are managed by the city's colleges and universities.

Allegheny Arsenal
Allegheny Commons
Allegheny Riverfront Park
ArtGardens of Pittsburgh
Chatham University Arboretum
Dippy
Flagstaff Hill, Pennsylvania
Frank Curto Park
Frick Park
Grand View Scenic Byway Park
Highland Park
Junction Hollow
Mary Schenley Memorial Fountain
McBride Park
Mellon Green
Mellon Park
Mellon Square
North Shore Riverfront Park
Panther Hollow
Panther Hollow Bridge
Phillips Park
Point of View
Point of View Park
Point State Park
Riverview Park
Roberto Clemente Memorial Park
Rodef Shalom Biblical Botanical Garden
Schenley Bridge
Schenley Park
Schenley Plaza
Sheraden Park
South Shore Riverfront Park
South Side Park
Stephen Foster
Three Rivers Heritage Trail
Three Rivers Park
West End Overlook
West End Park
Westinghouse Park

Pittsburgh
 
Parks